|}

The Prix de Barbeville is a Group 3 flat horse race in France open to thoroughbreds aged four years or older. It is run over a distance of 3,100 metres (about 1 mile and 7½ furlongs) at Longchamp in late April or early May.

History
The event is named after Haras de Barbeville, a successful stud farm established in the late 19th century. It was first run in 1889, and was originally contested over 3,000 metres. It was initially restricted to horses aged five or older, and was opened to four-year-olds in 1905.

The race was abandoned throughout World War I, with no running from 1915 to 1919.

The Prix de Barbeville was held at Auteuil in 1943, Maisons-Laffitte in 1944, and Le Tremblay in 1945. It was shortened to 2,400 metres in 1953. It was run over 2,600 metres in 1956, and restored to 3,000 metres in 1957.

The race was contested at Saint-Cloud over 2,800 metres in 1963. It returned to Longchamp with a length of 3,100 metres in 1964. It was cut to 3,000 metres in 1965, and reverted to 3,100 metres in 1966.

The Prix de Barbeville was staged at Saint-Cloud over 2,900 metres in 1991. It was switched to Maisons-Laffitte with a distance of 3,100 metres in 1992. For the following three years it was run at Saint-Cloud over 2,900 metres (1993–94) and 3,100 metres (1995).

The event returned to Longchamp in 1996, and was initially contested over 3,000 metres. It was extended to 3,100 metres in 1997.

Records
Most successful horse (2 wins):
 Presta – 1889, 1890
 Pardallo – 1968, 1969
 Recupere – 1974, 1975
 El Badr – 1979, 1982
 Denel – 1983, 1986
 Westerner – 2004, 2005

Leading jockey (5 wins):
 Yves Saint-Martin – Recupere (1974), Buckskin (1977), El Badr (1979), Denel (1983), Silver Green (1985)

Leading trainer (8 wins):
 André Fabre – Top Sunrise (1989), Mardonius (1991), Amilynx (2000), Morozov (2003), Host Nation (2007), Coastal Path (2008), Last Train (2013), Montclair (2014)

Leading owner (5 wins):
 Guy de Rothschild – Celadon (1964), White Label (1965), Alyscamps (1966), Arlequino (1972), Filandre (1973)

Winners since 1974

Earlier winners

 1889: Presta
 1890: Presta
 1891: Carmaux
 1892: Dacis
 1893: Fitz Roya
 1894: Acoli
 1895: Moulinois
 1896: Blandy
 1897: Vigoureux
 1898: Kerym
 1899: Longbow
 1900: Melina
 1901: Ismene
 1902: Clisiade
 1903: Passaro
 1904: Abydos
 1905: Parfait
 1906: Marsan
 1907: Ixia
 1908: Ingenu
 1909: Val Suzon
 1910: Chamoerops
 1911: Le Tocsin
 1912: Mereville
 1913: Hardie
 1914: Bavard
 1915–19: no race
 1920: Guido Reni
 1921: Lord Frey
 1922: Macfarlane
 1923: Nonchaloir
 1924: Balaam
 1925: Le Gueliz
 1926: Petit Frere
 1927: Juveilin
 1928: Bouillabaisse
 1929: Erodion
 1930: Picaflor
 1931: Taraval
 1932: Taxodium
 1933: Majordome
 1934: Convenio
 1935: Folle Passion
 1936: Arkina
 1937: Schamil
 1938: Le Chari
 1939: Lament
 1940: Belle Etoile
 1941: Babouino
 1942: Rouge et Noir
 1943: Merigo
 1944: Blue Mill
 1945: Woodcutter
 1946:
 1947: Diable Gris
 1948: Triolet
 1949: Rhode Islander
 1950:
 1951: Coast Guard
 1952: Satinette
 1953: Sari
 1954: Seriphos
 1955: Mahan
 1956:
 1957: Flying Flag
 1958: Clichy
 1959: Hope or Joke
 1960: Sheshoon
 1961: Toukaram
 1962: Gisors
 1963: Taine
 1964: Celadon
 1965: White Label
 1966: Alyscamps
 1967: Waylay
 1968: Pardallo
 1969: Pardallo
 1970: In the Purple
 1971: Ramsin
 1972: Arlequino
 1973: Filandre

See also
 List of French flat horse races

References

 France Galop / Racing Post:
 france-galop.com – A Brief History: Prix de Barbeville.
 galopp-sieger.de – Prix de Barbeville.
 ifhaonline.org – International Federation of Horseracing Authorities – Prix de Barbeville (2019).
 pedigreequery.com – Prix de Barbeville – Longchamp.

Open long distance horse races
Longchamp Racecourse
Horse races in France
1889 establishments in France
Recurring sporting events established in 1889